Such Is Life may refer to:

Film
 Such Is Life (1915 film), an American silent film starring Lon Chaney, Sr.
 Such Is Life (1924 film), an American silent short film starring Baby Peggy
 Such Is Life (1929 film) (Takový je život), a Czech film by Carl Junghans
 Such Is Life (1936 film), a British film starring Gene Gerrard
 Such Is Life (1939 film), an Argentine romantic drama
 Such Is Life (1996 film) (Sånt är livet), a film by Colin Nutley
 Such Is Life (2000 film), a Mexican drama
 Such is Life: The Troubled Times of Ben Cousins, a 2010 Australian documentary film about Australian rules footballer Ben Cousins

Other uses
 Such Is Life (novel), an 1897 novel by Joseph Furphy
 "Such Is Life", a 2001 song by Rank 1

See also 
 C'est la vie (disambiguation)